Kyari or Khair bin Bukhar al-Kanemi (?-1894) was Shehu of Borno in 1893-1894.

Reign of Kyari
Kyari became Shehu of Borno in 1893 when the country was invaded by Rabih az-Zubayr. One of his first acts was to kill his predecessor and uncle Ashimi of Borno.

He set to reconquer Kukawa already occupied by Rabih az-Zubayr but was captured during the battle. According to oral tradition, his last words for Rabih were

Dynasty

See also
 Rabih az-Zubayr

Footnotes

Bibliography
 Adeleye, Rowland, Power and Diplomacy in Northern Nigeria : 1804-1906, the Sokoto Caliphate and Its Enemies (London: Longman Group, 1971).
 Amegboh, Joseph, and Cécile Clairval, Rabah : Conquérant Des Pays Tchadiens, Grandes Figures Africaines (Paris: Dakar ; Abidjan : Nouvelles Éditions Africaines, 1976).
 Barth, Heinrich, Travels and Discoveries in North and Central Africa (London: Longman, 1857).
 Brenner, Louis, The Shehus of Kukawa: A History of the Al-Kanemi Dynasty of Bornu, Oxford Studies in African Affairs (Oxford, Clarendon Press, 1973).
 Cohen, Ronald, The Kanuri of Bornu, Case Studies in Cultural Anthropology (New York: Holt, 1967).
 Flint, John Edgar, Sir George Goldie and the Making of Nigeria, West African History Series (London: Oxford University Press, 1960).
 Hallam, W. K. R., The Life and Times of Rabih Fadl Allah (Ilfracombe: Stockwell, 1977).
 Hallam, W. K. R., ‘Rabih: His Place in History’, Borno Museum Society Newsletter, 15-16 (1993), 5-22.
 Horowitz, Michael M., ‘Ba Karim: An Account of Rabeh’s Wars’, African Historical Studies, 3 (1970), 391-402 .
 Lange, Dierk, 'The kingdoms and peoples of Chad', in General history of Africa, ed. by Djibril Tamsir Niane, IV (London: Unesco, Heinemann, 1984), pp. 238–265.
 Last, Murray, ‘Le Califat De Sokoto Et Borno’, in Histoire Generale De l'Afrique, Rev. ed. (Paris: Presence Africaine, 1986), pp. 599–646.
 Lavers, John, "The Al- Kanimiyyin Shehus: a Working Chronology" in Berichte des Sonderforschungsbereichs, 268, Bd. 2, Frankfurt a. M. 1993: 179-186.
 Mohammed, Kyari, Borno in the Rabih Years, 1893-1901 : The Rise and Crash of a Predatory State (Maiduguri Nigeria: University of Maiduguri, 2006).
 Monteil, P. L., De Saint-Louis À Tripoli Par Le Lac Tchad Voyage Au Travers Du Soudan Et Du Sahara, Accompli Pendant Les Années 1890-1892 (Paris: Germer Baillière, 1895).
 Nachtigal, Gustav, Sahara und Sudan : Ergebnisse Sechsjähriger Reisen in Afrika (Berlin: Weidmann, 1879).
 
 Palmer, Herbert Richmond, The Bornu Sahara and Sudan (London: John Murray, 1936).
 
 Tilho, Jean Auguste Marie, Tilho Mission, and France Ministère des Colonies, Documents Scientifiques De La Mission Tilho (1906–1909) (Paris: Imprimerie Nationale, 1910).

Royalty of Borno
1894 deaths
19th-century rulers in Africa
Year of birth missing
19th-century Nigerian people